Mega is a village in Moraid, Tambrauw Regency of Southwest Papua, Indonesia. The town is located on the northwestern coast of the Bird's Head Peninsula.

References

Populated places in Southwest Papua
Populated places in Tambrauw

Southwest Papua